WASP-189 b (also known as HD 133112 b) is an extrasolar planet that has an orbital period around its host star, WASP-189 (HD 133112), of less than three earth days, and is about 322 light-years away in the Libra constellation. It was first discovered in 2018, and was observed in 2020 by CHEOPS.

Discovery and observations
WASP-189 b was first discovered in 2018. In 2020, astronomers used CHEOPS to observe it. Based on a passage behind its host star (occultation) the planet's brightness could be measured and the temperature was estimated to be . Based on a passage in front of its host star (transit) the radius is 1.6 times the radius of Jupiter. Its atmosphere contains titanium oxide, and also contains metals such as chromium, magnesium, vanadium and manganese.

See also
 Hot Jupiter
 SuperWASP

References

External links
 Planet WASP-189 b

Exoplanets discovered by WASP
Exoplanets discovered in 2018
Giant planets
Hot Jupiters
Libra (constellation)
Transiting exoplanets